The smoothback skate (Rajella ravidula) is a species of fish in the family Rajidae. It is found in Namibia and South Africa. Its natural habitat is open seas.

References

Rajella
Taxonomy articles created by Polbot
Taxa named by P. Alexander Hulley
Fish described in 1970